Nadakkaparambil Francis Varghese (6 January 1950 – 19 June 2002) was an Indian actor who worked in Malayalam film industry. He began his career as a mimicry artist in Kalabhavan, acting in minor roles, but later he turned to strong villain roles. Akashadoothu was his major break through in career. He has acted in more than 100 films. He died at the age of 53 when he suffered a heart attack and fell unconscious while driving his car. He lived along with his wife, three daughters and a son.

Personal life
He was born into the Nadakkapparambil family in Choornikkara near Aluva, Kerala, as the third child among 5 children of Francis and Alice from Uliyannoor island. He attended primary school at Vidya Raja School Kadungallur. He later pursued M.A. in Malayalam from Union Christian College, Aluva.

He was married to Rosy from the Kollamkudy family in Kalady. The couple have four children named Sofia, Sony, Sumitha, and Saira.

Career
N.F. Varghese started his career as a mimicry artist in Kalabhavan. He later became a member of Cochin Harishree. He also worked as a manager in these mimicry troupes. He first acted in a small role in the 1986 movie Pappan Priyappetta Pappan, written by Siddique-Lal and directed by Sathyan Anthikkad. The movie was produced by the owner of Cochin Harishree, G. S. Harindran itself and was the debut movie of Siddique-Lal duo along with Harisree Asokan. Later, Varghese went on to act in small roles in several movies and it was the 1993 movie Akashadoothu, which gave a breakthrough in his film career. In this movie, which is considered one of the most influential melodramas of the 1990s in Malayalam, he played the antagonist role. He later went on to act on several memorable character and villain roles in Malayalam cinema. N.F. Varghese is best known for his roles in movies such as Spadikam, Samudayam, Aksharam, Lelam, Kudamattam, Patram, Commissioner, Sallapam, Punjabi House, Manthramothiram, Narasimham, Praja, Dubai, Ravanaprabhu, Nandanam, Ustad, F.I.R, Valliettan, Nariman, Sundara Purushan, Priyam, Vazhunnor, Onnaman and Phantom.

Though he played some of the best character roles in Malayalam, Varghese is mostly remembered for portraying some villain characters mainly because of his peculiar voice. His role as Vishawanathan in Pathram and Mambaram Bavan in Valliettan are such ones. His last credited role was in the 2003 comedy movie Sahodharan Sahadevan, which got released an year after his death.

Selected filmography

 Eeran Sandhya (1985) as Police inspector
 Akalathe Ambili (1985) as Police officer
 Poovinu Puthiya Poonthennal (1986) as Benny's fake father
 Pappan Priyappetta Pappan (1986) as Prabhakaran (debut movie)
 Simon Peter Ninakku Vendi (1988) as Police Officer
 Ramji Rav Speaking (1989) as Office staff
 Oru Kochu Bhoomikulukkam (1992)
 Akashadoothu (1993) as Kesavan
 Uppukandam Brothers (1993) as Chacko
 Thalamura (1993) as M. M. Thomas
 Naaraayam (1993) as Chelakkadan the politician
 Butterflies (1993) as Balan Menon
 Bhoomi Geetham (1993) as Gangadharan
 Sagaram Sakshi (1994)
 Puthran (1994) as Thankachan
 Prathakshinam (1994) as Paily the father of Rahel (Mathu)
 Manathe Vellitheru (1994) as Abdullah
 Kadal (1994) as Anandan
 Commissioner (1994) as Menon
 Chukkan (1994) as S.I. Chandran
 Karma (1995)
 Spadikam (1995) as Pachu Pillai
 Mazhayethum Munpe (1995) as Kaimal
 Thovalapookkal (1995) as Colonel Gopalan Thambi
 Special Squad (1995) as Ahamed
 Sipayi Lahala (1995) as Varma
 Samudhayam (1995) as Saithali
 Rajakeeyam (1995) as Rajadeva Varman
 Peter Scott (1995) as George Mathew
 Aksharam (1995) as Valappadu Balakrishnan
 Agrajan (1995)
 Mahaathma (1996) as Baba Rahim
 Swarna Kireedam (1996) as Varghese Thiruvampady
 Sallapam (1996) as Chandran Nair
 Rajaputhran (1996) as Isaac Thomas
 Mr. Clean (1996) as Dr. Alex
 Laalanam (1996) as Advocate Rajedran
 Kanchanam (1996) as Professor Ravi
 Excuse Me Ethu Collegila (1996)
 Ee Puzhayum Kadannu (1996) as Sukumaran
 Varnapakittu (1997) as Priest
 Guru (1997)
 Lelam (1997) as Kadayadi Raghavan
 Sammanam (1997) as Vasudevan
 Oru Yathramozhi (1997) as a Police officer
 Oru Mutham Manimutham (1997) as Krishna Menon
 Masmaram (1997) as Viswanathan
 Manthramothiram (1997) as Kuruppu
 Kudamaattom (1997)
 Kalyanak Kacheri (1997)
 Innalekalillaathe (1997) as Eppachan a Member of Parliament
 Guru Sishyan (1997)
 Gangothri (1997) as Adv. Nambiar
 Gajaraja Manthram (1997)
 Five Star Hospital (1997) as Dr. Nambiar
 Itha Oru Snehagatha (1997)
 Bhoopathi (1997) as Moosa
 Anubhoothi (1997) as Shankan Nair
 Aattuvela (1997)
 The Truth (1998) as Poozhimattom Thomachan
 Punjabi House (1998) as Sujatha's Father
 Oro Viliyum Kathorthu (1998) as Padmanabhan Nair
 Mayajalam (1998) as Sankaran Nair
 Graama Panchaayathu (1998) as Gunashekharan
 Amma Ammaayiyamma (1998) as Kaimal
 Achaammakkuttiyude Achaayan (1998) as Kozhipalli Avarachan
 Vazhunnor (1999) as Thevakattu Kuruvilla
 Ustaad (1999) as Mohan Thampi
 Swastham Grihabaranam (1999) as Pattatharayil Bhargava Kuruppu
 Stalin Sivadas (1999) as Sakhavu Anandan
 Pathram (1999) as Viswanathan
 Pallavur Devanarayanan (1999) as Mezhathoor Vaidyamatam Namboothiri
 Njangal Santhushtaranu (1999) as Kurukkal
 F.I.R (1999)
 Crime File (1999) as IG James George
 Chandamama (1999) as Mampulli
 Chandranudikkunna Dikkil (1999)
 Narashimham (2000) as Manappally Pavithran
 Sahayathrikakku Snehapoorvam (2000) as Sajan's father
 Vinayapoorvam Vidhyaadharan (2000) as M.S. Nair
 Varnakkazhchakal (2000) as Sudhakara Menon
 Valliettan (2000) as Mambaram Bava
 Sathyameva Jayathe (2000)
 Priyam (2000) as Thomachan
 Nadan Pennum Natupramaniyum (2000) as Bheeran
 Mark Antony (2000) as mullakka
 Cover Story (2000)
 Korappan The Great (2001) as G.N.D. Panikker
 Narasimha (2001) 
 Raavanaprabhu (2001) as Paul
 Sundara Purushan (2001) as Ramachandra Menon
 Nariman (2001) as (CM doctor) Dr. Giri
 Unnathangalil (2001) as Velu Bhai
 Praja (2001) as Home minister Lahayil Vakkachan
 Onnaman (2001) as Salim Bhai
 One Man Show (2001) as Dr. Nambiar
 Nagaravadhu (2001) as Parameswaran Namboothiri
 Dubai (2001) as Chandran Nair
 Ee Nadu Innalevare (2001) as Gauridas Ambalakkadan
 Nandanam (2002) as Sreedharan
 Snehithan (2002) as Padmanabhan
 Shivam (2002) as Sukumaran Nair
 Dany(2002) as Prof. Padmanabha Menon
 Chirikkudukka (2002) as Dr. Ninan
 Swarna Medal (2002) as Devadas
 Kaashillatheyum Jeevikkam (2002)
 The Gift Of God (2002)
 Kanalkiredam (2002)
 Phantom (2002) as Chellappan Pillai 
 Chandramukhi (2003)
 Sahodharan Sahadevan (2003) as Doctor (final film role)
  Kaduva (2022) as Karinkandathil Chandykkunju (Photo Credit)

Dubbing artist

Television
Dr. Harischadra (Doordarshan)
Mikayelinte santhathikal (Doordarshan)

References

External links

N F Varghese at MSI

Indian male film actors
Male actors from Kochi
1949 births
2002 deaths
Male actors in Malayalam cinema
20th-century Indian male actors
21st-century Indian male actors
Indian male voice actors
Indian male television actors
Male actors in Malayalam television
People from Aluva